These words of Australian Aboriginal origin include some that are used frequently within Australian-English, such as kangaroo and boomerang. Many such words have also become loaned words in other languages beyond English, while some are restricted to Australian English.

Flora and fauna

 ballart
 barramundi
 bilby
 bindii
 bogong
 boobook
 brigalow
 brolga
 budgerigar
 bunyip
 burdardu
 coolabah
 cunjevoi
 curara
 currawong
 dingo
 galah
 gang-gang
 geebung
 gidgee
 gilgie
 gymea
 jarrah
 kangaroo
 koala
 kookaburra
 kurrajong
 kutjera
 mallee
 marri
 mihirung
 mulga
 Myall
 numt
 pademelon
 potoroo
 quandong
 quokka
 quoll
 taipan
 wallaby
 wallaroo
 waratah
 warrigal
 witchetty
 wobbegong
 wombat
 wonga
 wonga-wonga
 yabby

Environment

 billabong
 bombora (rapids–often used to describe offshore reef breaks)
 boondie (hardened clump of sand; Noongar, W.A.)
 gilgai
lerp (crystallized honeydew produced by larvae of psyllid bugs, gathered as food)
 min-min lights (ground-level lights of uncertain origin sometimes seen in remote rural Australia)
 willy willy (dust devil)

Aboriginal culture

 alcheringa
 bingy (pron. binji) belly, esp. in bingy-button=navel
 boomerang
 bunyip
 coolamon (wooden curved bowl used to carry food or baby)
 corroboree
 dilli (a bag) commonly, and tautologically, as "dilly-bag"
 djanga
 gibber (a stone) esp. in gibber plain=stony desert
 gin (now a racially offensive word for an Aboriginal woman)
 gunyah
 humpy (a hut)
 kurdaitcha
 lubra (now a racially offensive word for an Aboriginal woman)
 marn grook
 mia-mia (a hut)
 nulla-nulla
 turndun
 waddy (a wooden club), earlier, any piece of wood
 woggabaliri
 woomera
 wurlie or wurley - a hut
 yabber or yabber-yabber (talk)
 yakka (doing work of any kind)
 Yara-ma-yha-who

Describing words

 Koori - Aboriginal people from Victoria and New South Wales
 cooee
 Nunga - Aboriginal people from South Australia 
 Murri - Aboriginal people from Queensland
 Noongar - Aboriginal people from southern Western Australia
 Palawa - Aboriginal people from Tasmania
 yarndi (slang term for marijuana)

Place names

Names 
 Kylie (Noongar word for "throwing stick")

English words often falsely assumed to be of Australian Aboriginal origin

 bandicoot (from the Telugu, pandikokku a term originally referring to the unrelated bandicoot rat)
 cockabully (from Māori kokopu)
 cockatoo (from Malay)
 didgeridoo (possibly from Irish or Scottish Gaelic dúdaire duh or dúdaire dúth [both /d̪u:d̪ɪrɪ d̪u:/] "black piper" or "native piper")
 emu (from Arabic, via Portuguese, for large bird)
 goanna (corruption of the Taíno iguana)
 jabiru (from Tupi–Guarani via Spanish, originally referred to an American bird)
 nullarbor (Latin for no tree'')'

References

Aboriginal
English
Australian
English words
Aboriginal